Anolis tropidogaster, the  tropical anole, is a species of lizard in the family Dactyloidae. The species is found in Colombia, Panama, and Venezuela.

References

Anoles
Reptiles of Colombia
Reptiles of Panama
Reptiles of Venezuela
Reptiles described in 1856
Taxa named by Edward Hallowell (herpetologist)